Lush Life is an album by jazz musician John Coltrane, released in early 1961 on Prestige Records. It was assembled from previously unissued tracks from three recording sessions at Van Gelder Studio in Hackensack, New Jersey in 1957 and 1958. As Coltrane's profile increased during the 1960s, some years after the end of his Prestige contract, the label used unissued recordings to create new albums without Coltrane's input or approval.

Track listing
 "Like Someone in Love" (Jimmy Van Heusen) – 5:00
 "I Love You" (Cole Porter) – 5:33
 "Trane's Slow Blues" (Coltrane) – 6:05
 "Lush Life" (Billy Strayhorn) – 14:00
 "I Hear a Rhapsody" (Jack Baker, George Fragos, Dick Gasparre) – 6:01

Personnel
Tracks 1-3
 John Coltrane – tenor saxophone
 Earl May – bass
 Art Taylor – drums

Tracks 4-5
 John Coltrane – tenor saxophone
 Red Garland – piano
 Paul Chambers – bass
 Donald Byrd – trumpet (track 4)
 Louis Hayes – drums  (track 4)
 Albert Heath – drums  (track 5)

See also
 John Coltrane and Johnny Hartman (1963) includes a version of the Strayhorn song 'Lush Life' with Johnny Hartman's vocal.

References

1961 albums
Grammy Hall of Fame Award recipients
John Coltrane albums
Prestige Records albums